Tanja Godina (born 21 September 1971 in Maribor) is a retired female backstroke swimmer from Slovenia. She was the only woman in the Slovenian Swimming Squad (five swimmers) at the 1992 Summer Olympics in Barcelona, Spain, and also the youngest member (21 years, 311 days).

References
sports-reference

1971 births
Living people
Female backstroke swimmers
Slovenian female swimmers
Olympic swimmers of Slovenia
Swimmers at the 1992 Summer Olympics
Sportspeople from Maribor